Sreejesh Nair (born 1980) is an Indian Sound Engineer and Sound Mixer. He has worked in Hindi, Marathi, Tamil and Malayalam films.

Biography

Sreejesh Nair owns to his credit a span of 20 years of experience since 2002, as a Sound Mixer in this industry. Sreejesh, who is currently based in Dubai and hails from Thiruvananthapuram, has done his B.Tech in Mechanical Engineering from Rajiv Gandhi Institute of Technology, Kottayam and mastered Audio Engineering From Chetana Sound Studios, Thrissur. He started his career as assistant sound re-recording mixer in Rajkamal(FutureWorks) studios and has since become a Senior Re-Recording Mixer there. He has worked on more than 200 movies since then. He was part of the First Dolby Atmos Mix theater installation in India and the first Dolby Atmos Premiere mix room in the world. He is an internationally renowned subject expert for Dolby Atmos and immersive Music mixing.  Sreejesh Nair won the 60th National Film Awards for the best Re-recordist of the Final Mixed Track for the film Gangs of Wasseypur. His work for the documentary, A Few Sound Men, directed by Avinash Jojo Antony, earned him 4 IRAA Awards in 2020. The highest number by a single person.
He has also done a number of art installations in Paris and Mumbai with artists like Shilpa Gupta & Rajivan Ayyappan. He is currently working as Solutions Specialist at Avid.

Filmography

References

External links
 
 

Production sound mixers
1980 births
Living people
Musicians from Thiruvananthapuram
Indian audio engineers
Kendriya Vidyalaya alumni